António da Silva Mendes (18 October 1939 – 27 February 2019), nicknamed "Pé Canhão" (cannon foot) was a Portuguese footballer who played as forward.

Mendes gained one cap for Portugal against Sweden in Lisbon on 13 November 1966, in a 1–2 defeat.

Honours
Benfica
Primeira Liga: 1959–60, 1960–61
Taça de Portugal: 1958–59, 1960–61
Intercontinental Cup runner-up: 1961

References

External links
 
 

1939 births
2019 deaths
Footballers from Lisbon
Portuguese footballers
Association football forwards
Primeira Liga players
S.L. Benfica footballers
Vitória S.C. players
Portugal under-21 international footballers
Portugal international footballers